The 89th Infantry Division, originally known as the "89th Division," was an infantry formation of the United States Army that was active during World War I, World War II, and the Cold War.

History

World War I

The 89th Division was officially activated in August 1917, four months after the American entry into World War I, at Camp Funston, Fort Riley, Kansas, under the command of Major General Leonard Wood, formerly the Chief of Staff of the United States Army. Initial drafts of enlisted men came from Arizona, Colorado, Kansas, Missouri, Nebraska, New Mexico, and South Dakota. The division, now commanded by Major General William M. Wright, was sent overseas to join the American Expeditionary Force (AEF) in the final stages of World War I, which ended on November 11, 1918, due to the Armistice with Germany. The 89th Division, now under Major General Frank L. Winn, participated in the battles of St. Mihiel and the Meuse-Argonne Offensive.  Two 89th staff officers would serve together in significant roles in WWII: Division Chief of Staff Col. John C. H. Lee, and his G-4 Supply Officer, Lt. Col. Brehon B. Somervell, who also received the Distinguished Service Cross (United States) for leading a three-man patrol to inspect damage to a bridge some 600 yards (550 m) in front of American lines. Lee would serve under Somervell in the Army Service Forces from 1942 to 1945.  The 89th was inactivated in May 1919, after being in existence for just less than two years.

Order of battle
 Headquarters, 89th Division
 177th Infantry Brigade
 353rd Infantry Regiment
 354th Infantry Regiment
 341st Machine Gun Battalion
 178th Infantry Brigade
 355th Infantry Regiment
 356th Infantry Regiment
 342nd Machine Gun Battalion
 164th Field Artillery Brigade
 340th Field Artillery Regiment (75 mm)
 341st Field Artillery Regiment (75 mm)
 342nd Field Artillery Regiment (155 mm)
 314th Trench Mortar Battery
 340th Machine Gun Battalion 
 314th Engineer Regiment
 314th Medical Regiment
 314th Field Signal Battalion
 Headquarters Troop, 89th Division
 314th Train Headquarters and Military Police
 314th Ammunition Train
 314th Supply Train
 314th Engineer Train
 314th Sanitary Train
 353rd, 354th, 355th, and 356th Ambulance Companies and Field Hospitals

Between the wars
The division was reconstituted in the Organized Reserve (present-day United States Army Reserve) on 24 June 1921 and assigned to the states of Nebraska, Kansas, and South Dakota. The headquarters was organized on 2 September 1921 at the Army Building at 15th and Dodge Streets in Omaha, Nebraska. It moved in April 1922 to 22nd and Hickory Streets, and to the new Federal Office Building on 18 January 1934, where it remained until the division was ordered into active military service for World War II. The designated mobilization station for the division during this period was Fort Riley, Kansas.

World War II
The 89th Infantry Division landed in France at Le Havre, 21 January 1945, and engaged in several weeks of precombat training before moving up to the Sauer River into jump-off positions east of Echternach, 11 March 1945. The next day, the offensive began, and the 89th plunged across the Sauer in a rapid advance to and across the Moselle, 17 March. The offensive rolled on, and the division assaulted across the Rhine River on 26 March 1945 under intense fire in the Wellmich-Oberwesel region. A pontoon bridge was built across the Rhine from St. Goar to St. Goarshausen. In April, the 89th attacked toward Eisenach, taking that town on 6 April. The next objective, Friedrichroda, was secured by 8 April. On 4 April 1945, the 89th overran Ohrdruf, a subcamp of the Buchenwald concentration camp. The division continued to move eastward toward the Mulde River, capturing Zwickau by 17 April. The advance was halted, 23 April, and from then until VE-day, the division saw only limited action, engaging in patrolling and general security. Three towns, Lößnitz, Aue, and Stollberg, were kept under constant pressure, but no attacks were launched.

Order of battle 
 Headquarters, 89th Infantry Division
 353rd Infantry Regiment
 354th Infantry Regiment
 355th Infantry Regiment
 Headquarters and Headquarters Battery, 89th Infantry Division Artillery
 340th Field Artillery Battalion (105 mm)
 341st Field Artillery Battalion (105 mm)
 563rd Field Artillery Battalion (155 mm)
 914th Field Artillery Battalion (105 mm)
 314th Engineer Combat Battalion
 314th Medical Battalion
 89th Cavalry Reconnaissance Troop (Mechanized)
 Headquarters, Special Troops, 89th Infantry Division
 Headquarters Company, 89th Infantry Division
 789th Ordnance Light Maintenance Company
 89th Quartermaster Company
 89th Signal Company
 Military Police Platoon
 Band
 89th Counterintelligence Corps Detachment

Post-war
The 89th was reactivated as a Reserve unit in 1947 with headquarters in Wichita, Kansas and redesignated as the 89th Division (Training) in 1959. In 1973 the division colors were cased and the shoulder patch (but not the lineage and honors) was continued in use as the 89th Army Reserve Command (ARCOM).  (ARCOMs were not tactical commands, but were instead regional conglomerations of unrelated units. Upon mobilization, units within the ARCOMs would be assigned to active duty units with which they were aligned.) The 89th ARCOM was later redesignated as the 89th Regional Support Command, and in 2003 it became the 89th Regional Readiness Command. In its 2005 BRAC recommendations, United States Department of Defense recommended realigning the Wichita US Army Reserve Center by disestablishing the 89th Regional Readiness Command. This recommendation was part of a larger recommendation to re-engineer and streamline the command and control structure of the Army Reserves that would create the Northwest Regional Readiness Command at Fort McCoy, Wisconsin. The 89th currently exists as the 89th Sustainment Brigade in the Reserve.

Combat Record (World War II) 

Ordered into active service: 5 July 1942 at Camp Carson, Colorado 
Overseas: 10 January 1945.
Campaigns: Rhineland, Central Europe
Days of Combat: 57
Entered Combat: 12 March 1945
Killed in Action: 292
Total Casualties: 1,029
Awards: DSM-1 ; SS-46; LM-5; SM-1 ; BSM-135 ; AM-17.
Commanders:Maj. Gen. William H. Gill (July 1942-February 1943),Maj. Gen. Thomas D. Finley (February 1943 to inactivation).
Returned to United States: 16 December 1945.
Inactivated: 27 December 1945 at Camp Shanks, New York.

See also 
Charles Denver Barger - Medal of Honor recipient
David B. Barkley - Medal of Honor recipient
Marcellus H. Chiles - Medal of Honor recipient
M. Waldo Hatler - Medal of Honor recipient
J. Hunter Wickersham - Medal of Honor recipient
Jesse N. Funk - Medal of Honor recipient
Harold A. Furlong – Medal of Honor recipient
Charles E. Kilbourne - Medal of Honor and Distinguished Service Cross recipient who served as the 89th Division's chief of staff in World War I
Charles T. Payne - (great-uncle of Barack Obama, the 44th President of the United States)
Marcelino Serna - the most decorated soldier from Texas in World War I.
Ferdinand Louis Schlemmer – Division camouflage officer in World War I and noted artist in civilian life.
Maurice Rose - future commander of the 3rd Armored Division during World War II who served with the 89th Division during World War I
John C. H. Lee - future lieutenant general who served as aide-de-camp to Major General Leonard Wood at Ft. Riley, then as 89th Div. Chief of Staff in the AEF under MG Winn, and the youngest full-colonel in WWI.

Footnotes

Bibliography 
89th Infantry Division website: http://www.89infdivww2.org/index.htm.The Army Almanac: A Book of Facts Concerning the Army of the United States U.S. Government Printing Office, 1950 reproduced at http://www.history.army.mil/html/forcestruc/cbtchron/cbtchron.html
Davis, Henry Blaine. Generals in Khaki''. Raleigh, NC: Pentland Press, 1998.

Further reading

External links 

89th Infantry Division Website
Rolling Ahead!: The Story of the 89th Infantry Division

089th Infantry Division, U.S.
Military units and formations established in 1917
Military units and formations disestablished in 1973
Infantry Division, U.S. 089
United States Army divisions of World War I
Infantry divisions of the United States Army in World War II